Marcus Lakee Edwards (born March 29, 1976), better known by his stage name Lil' Keke, is an American rapper and original member of the Southern hip hop collective Screwed Up Click.

Biography

Music career
Lil' Keke gained national attention with his track "Southside" from his 1997 release "Don't Mess Wit Texas". 
In 2005, Lil' Keke signed to Swishahouse Records. In an interview with HitQuarters at the time, label president and A&R T. Farris said, "He is a legend here in Houston. He plays a big role in the whole style of rap that we make down here." Lil' Keke started out working alongside DJ Screw doing mixtapes.

Community service
In 2016, the rapper received an award from President Barack Obama for his community service efforts in the Houston area.

Discography

Studio albums
 1997: Don't Mess wit Texas
 1998: The Commission
 1999: It Was All A Dream
 2001: Peepin' In My Window
 2001: Platinum In Da Ghetto
 2002: Birds Fly South
 2003: Street Stories
 2003: Changin' Lanes
 2004: Currency
 2005: Undaground All Stars: The Texas Line Up
 2008: Loved by Few, Hated by Many
 2012: Heart of a Hustla
 2014: Money Don't Sleep
 2016: Slfmade
 2018: Slfmade 2
 2020: Slfmade 3
 2022: Lgnd

Other albums
 2001: From Coast to Coast
 2010: Still Standing
 2011: Ridin' with da Top Off Vol.1: Best of Both Worlds
 2011: Testimony
 2012: The Round Table
 2013: Top Features Vol.1
 2014: The Round Table Vol.2: Still Hungry
 2015: Top Features Vol.2

Collaboration albums
2003: The Big Unit (with Slim Thug)
2004: Wreckin' 2004 (with Big Hawk)
2004: Bad Company (with Shorty Mac)
2005: Str8 Out da Slums (with The Jacka)
2005: Since the Gray Tapes Vol.3 (with Big Pokey)
2006: If You Ain’t Hungry, Don’t Come To The Table (with CMG)
2008: Still Wreckin''' (with H.A.W.K.)
2011: Standing Ovation (with Don Chief)
2013: Trunk Waving and Misbehavin' (with DJ Gold of the SUC)
2014: From the Southside to WTX (with Rawsome Russ)
2020: Slab Talk''(with Paul Wall)

References

 

1976 births
Living people
African-American male rappers
Gangsta rappers
Rappers from Houston
Screwed Up Click members
Songwriters from Texas
Southern hip hop musicians
Underground rappers
21st-century American rappers
21st-century American male musicians
Universal Motown Records artists
African-American songwriters
21st-century African-American musicians
20th-century African-American people
American male songwriters